David Peat (1793–1879) was a Scottish officer in the Royal Navy who attained the rank of admiral after his retirement.

He was born in Kirkcaldy on 21 June 1793. He was the son of Robert Peat (1773-1848) and Isobell Coushat.

The ship saw action against Danish gun-boats in the North Sea. In January 1812, he transferred at the rank of midshipman to  under Captains Christopher Bell and James Tomkinson, travelling to Brazil and the West Indies. In the summer of 1814, he joined HMS Dunira under Captain Edward Boys in the Leeward Islands for three months before joining . From December 1815 to June 1816, he was on board , a 74-gun ship of the line under Captain George Mundy.

Reappointed to the Severn, they were posted to Dungeness, again dealing with smugglers. On one occasion, he killed a man with his naval cutlass. In the ensuing months, he was shot twice in the thigh at Folkestone and in June 1821, with only three other men, was attacked by 60 men, suffering 18 firearm wounds, while his quartermaster was killed. For his conduct and injuries, Peat was promoted to commander on 9 June 1821 and given a lifelong pension.

From 1836 to 1840, he was given gentler duties as an Inspecting Commander with the Coast Guard. On 2 August 1843, he married a woman named Elizabeth (née Ballingall), widow of David Pratt. He was promoted to captain on 1 January 1847.

He retired to Viewforth House in south-west Edinburgh. He was subsequently promoted to "Retired Rear-Admiral", as of 13 April 1865, vice-admiral on 1 October 1871, and full admiral.

He died on 20 June 1879 at Markinch in Fife and is buried in Northhall Cemetery at Markinch Church. He also has a memorial in New Calton Burial Ground in Edinburgh.

Viewforth House was demolished around 1900 in order to build Boroughmuir High School.

Admiral Terrace in the Tollcross area of Edinburgh (near Viewforth House) was named after Admiral Peat.

References

1793 births
1879 deaths
Scottish admirals
Royal Navy admirals
People from Kirkcaldy